Giselle Amelia González Aranda (born Santiago de Veraguas, Panamá) is a Panamanian beauty pageant contestant winner of the Señorita Panamá 1992 title. Also represented Panama in Miss Universe 1993, the 42nd Miss Universe pageant was held at  Auditorio Nacional, Mexico City, Mexico on May 21, 1993.

She represented Veraguas state.

Also is the third woman from Veraguas to win the title of Señorita Panamá, the first was Berta López (1970) and second Gilda García López (1986).

References

External links
Señorita Panamá official website
Misspanama.net

Living people
Miss Universe 1993 contestants
Panamanian beauty pageant winners
Señorita Panamá
Year of birth missing (living people)